Gabriela Creţu (born  January 16, 1965) is a Romanian politician and member of the Social Democratic Party (PSD), part of the Party of European Socialists. Elected to the Chamber of Deputies for Vaslui County in the 2004 elections, she became a Member of the European Parliament on January 1, 2007, with the accession of Romania to the European Union.

Biography
Born in Târgu Frumos, Creţu graduated from the Iaşi High School of Economic and Administrative Law (1983), and then from the Faculty of Philosophy at the University of Iaşi (1987). She later specialized in Gender studies, Political communications, Gender mainstreaming, and Political campaigning. In 1998, Creţu took her PhD in Epistemology and the Philosophy of science. She has authored and published several essays in the field.

Between 1987 and 2004, she taught Social science at high schools in Vaslui. Having joined the National Salvation Front in 1990, she followed it into the transformations that led to its transformation into the present-day PSD; since 1998, she serves on the party's National Council; until 2001, she was also Secretary of the PSD Women's Forum, and, since 2005, she is Vice President of the National Social Democratic Women's Organization.

As a deputy, Creţu served on the Committee for Culture, Arts, and Mass-Media. She is the mother of one son.

References 
  Profile at the Chamber of Deputies site

External links 
  Official site and blog
 European Parliament profile
 European Parliament official photo

1965 births
Living people
Social Democratic Party (Romania) politicians
People from Târgu Frumos
Romanian essayists
Romanian schoolteachers
21st-century Romanian women politicians
Romanian women writers
Romanian writers
Alexandru Ioan Cuza University alumni
Romanian socialist feminists
Social Democratic Party (Romania) MEPs
MEPs for Romania 2007
Women MEPs for Romania
MEPs for Romania 2007–2009
Romanian women essayists
21st-century Romanian politicians